Teen Babes from Monsanto is an EP of cover songs released by American rock band Redd Kross.

Release
Teen Babes from Monsanto was released in 1984 on Gasatanka Records and Filmworks, on 12-inch vinyl disc and Compact Cassette.

Critical reception
AllMusic critic John Dougan said of the album, "The title says it all. Speedy, sloppy pop loaded with fuzzed-up guitars and whiny vocals. Mostly covers (Stooges, Kiss, Bowie), it's a great little statement of purpose from these '70s hard-rock babes-turned-adults."

Reissues
All seven songs were included on the Insipid Vinyl label compilation CD Trance: Australian Tour 1992, released in 1992.

In June 2015, the record was reissued as a full-length LP under the title Teen Babes from Monsanto: Versión Especial, a numbered limited edition of 250 copies, self-released by the band to commemorate the record's 31st anniversary, featuring three bonus cover versions and alternate double-fronted cover art designed by Jonathan Krop.

Track listing

2015: Versión Especial

Personnel
 Jeff McDonald – guitars, lead vocals
 Steven McDonald – fuzz bass and lead bass, backing vocals
 Dave Peterson – drums, piano
 Bruce Duff – Guitar solo on "Deuce"
 Sid Griffin – Harmonica on "Blow You a Kiss in the Wind"

Notes

References

External links
 Teen Babes from Monsanto. AllMusic.
 Teen Babes from Monsanto. Discogs.
 Teen Babes from Monsanto. Bandcamp

1984 albums
Redd Kross albums
Covers albums